Berriedale Castle is a ruined castle located on a promontory on the south of the entrance to the Berriedale Water, Caithness in Scotland.

Structure
The castle is located on a promontory on the southern side of the Berriedale Water. It is surrounded by sea cliffs and the landward approach was separated by large ditch.

History
The castle was known to be held by Reginald le Chen of Inverugie and Duffus, in the early 14th century. It passed by marriage of his daughter Mary to Nicholas Sutherland. The castle later passed by the marriage of Christian, the daughter and heiress of Alexander Sutherland, Master of Duffus, to William Oliphant in the 15th century. Andrew Oliphant sold the property to his uncle, Laurence, Lord Oliphant in 1526. The Sutherlands of Duffus attacked and captured the castle in 1566, before handing the castle back to the Oliphants. The castle was sold in 1606 to the Earl of Caithness.

References

Clan Sutherland
Former castles in Scotland